Daoud Musa Daoud (born February 2, 1982) is a professional basketball player. He plays for Qatar SC of the Qatar basketball league.  He is also a member of the Qatar national basketball team.

Musa competed for the Qatar national basketball team at the 2005, 2007 and FIBA Asia Championship 2009.  He also competed for Qatar at their only FIBA World Championship performance to date, in 2006, where he averaged 5.2 points per game.  Previously he competed for the junior national team at the 1999 FIBA World Championship for Junior Men and 2001 FIBA World Championship for Young Men.

References

1982 births
Living people
Qatari men's basketball players
Asian Games medalists in basketball
Basketball players at the 2002 Asian Games
Basketball players at the 2006 Asian Games
Basketball players at the 2010 Asian Games
Basketball players at the 2014 Asian Games
Shooting guards
Asian Games silver medalists for Qatar
Medalists at the 2006 Asian Games
2006 FIBA World Championship players